"Let's Ride" is a song performed by rapper The Game for his second album, Doctor's Advocate. The song was written by The Game and Scott Storch and was released as the album's second single on September 25, 2006. The Game mentioned on radio station KDAY in Los Angeles, California that the track was recorded in Miami, Florida, but had the feel of a West Coast Dr. Dre record. The song peaked at number 46 on the Billboard Hot 100 chart. The song heavily references the 1993 single "Let Me Ride" by rapper Dr. Dre.

Reception
"Let's Ride" received mediocre reviews from music critics. MusicOMH wrote that the track "lacks in any of the vigour and enthusiasm that came with his debut major release album". Pitchfork Media gave the song a negative review saying, "What an embarrassment this song turned out to be, lumberingly obvious and poorly crafted from the first awkward gang reference to the last Dre namedrop." About.com's Henry Adaso called the track "just another boring mantra devoid of substance" with The Game delivering "a lethargic sprawl, replete with 50 Cent-esque crooning and tautological Dre odes ("Ain't nuthin' but a G thang, baby, it's a G thang")." Entertainment Weekly, in a review of Doctor's Advocate, wrote that the song "recycle[s] Dre's signature high-pitched synths and plinking pianos" and is "marred by stale rhymes chronicling cartoonish gangbanging." Chocolate magazine said the track "lacks charisma and substance, and is filled with 50 Cent-style tuneless crooning, endless name checks for Aftermath, Eminem and Dr. Dre and empty lyrics". There is also an unofficial remix for this song featuring Ice Cube, Snoop Dogg and Xzibit.

Music video
The music video premiered on Black Entertainment Television's 106 & Park on October 23, 2006 as a "new joint". On November 14, 2006, the video debuted on MTV's Total Request Live at #10 and stayed on the chart for well over 16 days. The Game is seen riding in a 1964 Chevrolet Impala with hydraulics and contains a cameo appearance by fellow West Coast rapper Snoop Dogg. The video was also the subject of an MTV Making the Video episode like his previous single, "Dreams".

Track listing

Side A
"Let's Ride (clean)" – 3:53
"Let's Ride (dirty)" – 3:53
"Let's Ride (instrumental)" – 3:53
"Let's Ride (acappella)" – 3:53

Side B
"Let's Ride (clean)" – 3:53
"Let's Ride (dirty)" – 3:53
"Let's Ride (instrumental)" – 3:53
"Let's Ride (a cappella)" – 3:53

Charts

References

External links

2006 singles
The Game (rapper) songs
Song recordings produced by Scott Storch
Songs written by Scott Storch
Music videos directed by Director X
Gangsta rap songs
G-funk songs
Songs written by The Game (rapper)
2006 songs
Geffen Records singles